Ronald Butler Jr. is a Bahamian-born American television actor, director and comedian who is best known for portraying Oscar, the clever receptionist, on the Nickelodeon television series True Jackson, VP, from 2008 to 2011. He often portrays former President Barack Obama in comedy sketches. He has performed with the Atlantic Theater Company for over 20 years.

Early life
Butler is originally from the Bahamas. He is named after his father Ronnie Butler, Sr., a calypso singer, songwriter, and recording artist. As a child, Butler sometimes performed with his father.  Butler grew up partly in the United States (Washington, D.C., Virginia, and the suburbs of Syracuse, New York) and partly in the Bahamas. He attended high school in the Bahamas and graduated magna cum laude from Trinity International University near Chicago, Illinois, receiving a B.A. in History and Economics in 1985.

Butler worked as an economic consultant for a law firm based in Washington, D.C., before beginning his acting career. While in Washington, Butler studied acting privately with Vera Katz of Howard University and performed in regional theatre around Washington.  Later, he studied with David Mamet, William H. Macy, Felicity Huffman, Scott Zigler and Robert Bella of the Atlantic Theater Company.

Career
Butler became a member of the Off-Broadway Atlantic Theater Company in New York City in 1991, the same year that he appeared in the film Homicide.  With Atlantic, he has performed in, among other works, Once in a Lifetime.  Among other Off-Broadway and regional theatre roles, he played Bunker and other roles in a revival of Merrily We Roll Along (and on the cast recording) with the York Theatre Company in 1994.  He then sang in a swing band, The Solicitors, in Europe for some years.  In 2007, he played Henry in the concert production of South Pacific at the Hollywood Bowl with Reba McEntire and Brian Stokes Mitchell.

He appeared in the 2004 HBO film Everyday People, as Ron Harding, for which he won an IFP Award for Best Breakout Performance.  He also appeared in the films Smother (2007) and Rain (2008).  He played Oscar, the clever receptionist for Mad Style, on the television series True Jackson, VP, from 2008 to 2011.  He was in the Hollywood Bowl production of South Pacific.  He plays Vice Principal Lewis on the web series First Day.  He has guest-starred in such TV shows as Without a Trace, Crossing Jordan, Boston Legal, How I Met Your Mother, Scrubs, Ugly Betty, Medium, Dirty Sexy Money and in the first episode of the fourth series of Torchwood entitled "The New World".

Butler also writes and performs sketch comedies.  President Barack Obama is one of his most noted characters.  In October 2010, he released a YouTube video, as Obama, singing a pastiche of the "Major-General's Song" that affectionately lampooned the President.  The video was widely distributed on the internet.

Television and film appearances

Narrations

Web

References

External links

World Animal Awareness Society interview, 2010

American directors
American male television actors
Living people
Place of birth missing (living people)
Year of birth missing (living people)
American male comedians
Bahamian emigrants to the United States
20th-century American male actors
20th-century American comedians
21st-century American male actors
21st-century American comedians
American male stage actors
African-American male actors
African-American male comedians
Trinity International University alumni
20th-century African-American people
21st-century African-American people